Below is the list of railway stations in Turkey. Although there are hundreds of stations only those stations which can be linked to articles in Wikipedia are shown.

railway stations
railway stations
Turkey
Turkey